Shabiluy-e Sofla (also Romanized as Shabīlūy-e Soflá; also known as Shabīlū-ye Pā’īn and Shabīlū-ye Soflá) is a village in, and the capital of Zarrineh Rud-e Shomali Rural District of the Central District of Miandoab County, West Azerbaijan province, Iran. At the 2006 National Census, its population was 1,635 in 398 households. The following census in 2011 counted 1,526 people in 443 households. The latest census in 2016 showed a population of 1,533 people in 457 households.

References 

Miandoab County

Populated places in West Azerbaijan Province

Populated places in Miandoab County